The assassination of Bronisław Pieracki was a target killing of Poland's top politician of the interwar period, Minister of Interior Bronisław Pieracki (1895-1934), by the Organization of Ukrainian Nationalists (OUN).

OUN was formed in Poland as an amalgamation of a number of extreme right-wing organizations, including the Union of Ukrainian Fascists. From the moment of its founding in 1929, fascism played a central role in the organization, combining extreme ethno-nationalism with terrorism, corporatism, and anti-Semitism. The chosen assassin, Hryhorij Maciejko pseudonym "Gonta", was a trusted member of OUN.

History

The assassination plan was decided at an OUN meeting in Berlin. Maciejko was supplied with a makeshift bomb and a 7.65mm caliber pistol from Bandera. In the morning of 15 June 1934 Maciejko (aged 31) appeared at the Foksal Street in Warsaw in front of a social club frequented by Pieracki. He waited there for several hours undetected. The minister arrived in his limousine at 3:30 pm; however, Maciejko's bomb failed. He pulled the gun and shot the minister from behind twice in the back of his head. Maciejko escaped successfully with the help of OUN emissaries as far as Czechoslovakia and then to Argentina. The state funeral of Pieracki was attended by some 100,000 people. The coffin was sent to Nowy Sącz in a special train and laid in his family tomb.

The Polish authorities did not realize at first that OUN was behind the assassination and blamed the Polish National Radical Camp (ONR) for it. The mistake had terrible consequences for Poland's political life. As a result of this, the Bereza Kartuska prison for dissidents was established. A year later, it became known that OUN was behind the assassination of Bronisław Pieracki. The trial of OUN leaders before a Warsaw circuit court took place between 18 November 1935 and 13 January 1936. Stepan Bandera, Mykola Lebed and several other members of the OUN were proven guilty of organizing the assassination. The actual assassin, Hryhorij Maciejko, never faced a judge, he died in Buenos Aires in 1966.

Accused

16 members of the OUN were tried during the Warsaw process, including Stepan Bandera, Bohdan Pidhainy, Mykola Lebed, Yaroslav Karpynets, Mykola Klymyshyn, Dariya Hnatkivska, Yaroslav Rak, Yakiv Chorniy, Kateryna Zarytska, Ivan Malyutsa, Roman Myhal and Yevhen Kachmarsky.

Penalty
After a two-month trial in Warsaw, the court sentenced the guilty as follows:
 Stepan Bandera, Mykola Lebed and Yaroslav Karpynets were sentenced to death, (commuted to life imprisonment due to amnesty);
 Mykola Klymyshyn, Bohdan Pidhainy sentenced to life imprisonment;
 Dariya Hnatkivska sentenced to 15 years imprisonment;
 Ivan Malyutsa, Roman Myhal and Yevhen Kachmarsky - 12 years imprisonment;
 Kateryna Zarytska - 8 years imprisonment;
 Yaroslav Rak and Yakiv Chorny - 7 years imprisonment.
The court also denied Hnatkivska, Malyutsa, Kachmarsky, Myhal, Chorny, Zarytska and Rak civil rights for 10 years.

See also
 Assassination of Gabriel Narutowicz, first interwar president, 1922

References

Further reading
The Warsaw Act of indictment against Stepan Bandera and his comrades / Ed. by Mykola Posivnych. Lviv, 2005. 
Żeleński W. Zabójstwo ministra Pierackiego. 

1935 in case law
1935 in Poland
1936 in case law
1936 in Poland
Political history of Ukraine
Organization of Ukrainian Nationalists
Poland–Ukraine relations
Trials in Poland
June 1934 events
Terrorism in Poland
Terrorist incidents in Second Polish Republic
1934 in Poland
1934 crimes in Poland
Pieracki, Bronisław